Three Rivers Academy may refer to:

 Three Rivers Academy, Trois-Rivières, Québec, Canada, a high school
 Three Rivers Academy, Surrey, England, a secondary school
 Three Rivers Academy Sixth Form College, Surrey, England, a junior college

See also
 Three Rivers High School (disambiguation)
 Three Rivers College (disambiguation)
 Three Rivers (disambiguation)